AIA PUBLIC Takaful Bhd. is a Malaysian takaful company, jointly owned by AIA Group Limited and Public Bank Berhad.

The company is the successor to two former takaful operators—ING Public Takaful Ehsan and AIA AFG Takaful. ING Public was the takaful joint venture between ING Group and Public Bank until 2012, when AIA acquired ING's Malaysian operations. AIA AFG was the takaful joint venture between AIA and Alliance Financial Group (AFG). Subsequent to AIA's acquisition of ING's stake in ING Public (renamed AIA PUBLIC), AFG disposed of its interest in AIA AFG. AIA AFG was then merged into AIA Public, with the transfer of business completed in 2014. The series of transactions resulted in AIA Group and Public Bank holding 70 and 30 percent interests respectively in the company.

AIA PUBLIC distributes family takaful products via AIA Malaysia's 17,000 insurance agents (known as life planners) (as of 2015) and Public Bank's over 250 branches in Malaysia.

The company made its first surplus distribution in 2014.

References

External links
 

2011 establishments in Malaysia
Takaful companies of Malaysia
Companies based in Kuala Lumpur
Financial services companies established in 2011
Privately held companies of Malaysia